The 2014 Michigan Wolverines football team represented the University of Michigan in the sport of college football during the 2014 NCAA Division I FBS football season. The Wolverines played in the new East Division of the Big Ten Conference and played their home games at Michigan Stadium in Ann Arbor, Michigan. The team was led by fourth-year head coach Brady Hoke.
It was nicknamed "Team 135" in reference to the 135-year tradition of the Michigan football program.

The season was characterized by a growing frustration among Michigan fans and media with the coaching of Brady Hoke and the leadership of athletic director Dave Brandon. In the second game of the year, Michigan suffered its first shutout loss since 1984 and the most lopsided defeat in series history when they lost to Notre Dame 31–0. In a 30–14 loss to Minnesota three weeks later, coach Hoke received criticism for keeping quarterback Shane Morris in the game after he appeared to have suffered a concussion. After losing to Rutgers, Michigan was 0–2 in Big Ten play for the first time since 1967.
Michigan ultimately compiled a 5–7 record, including 3–5 in conference play to finish in a tie for fourth place in the East Division. This marked the first season since 2009, and only the third season since 1975, in which Michigan missed a bowl game.

On October 31, following large student demonstrations, athletic director Dave Brandon resigned. On December 2, head coach Brady Hoke was fired. He finished at Michigan with a four-year record of 31–20.

Preseason
The 2013 team compiled a 7–6 record under third-year head coach Brady Hoke and faced Kansas State in the Buffalo Wild Wings Bowl, losing 31–14.

Hoke announced that the quarterback position was an open battle prior to spring practice, notably including 5th-year senior Devin Gardner and sophomore Shane Morris, and later named Gardner the starter on August 12. On February 12, Michigan announced that tight end Jake Butt suffered a torn ACL and would miss all of spring practice. On March 20, Michigan announced that center Graham Glasgow would be suspended for a portion of spring practice and the season opener against Appalachian State for a violation of team rules stemming from a drunk driving arrest. On June 10, Michigan announced that running back Ty Isaac was transferring to the team from USC, but the NCAA denied his request for a waiver to play for Michigan immediately, forcing him to redshirt the 2014 season.

Michigan returned 15 starters from the 2013 team. Michigan lost starting running back Fitzgerald Toussaint, wide receiver Jeremy Gallon, offensive tackles Taylor Lewan and Michael Schofield, safety Thomas Gordon, defensive tackles Jibreel Black and Quinton Washington, kicker Brendan Gibbons, and long snapper Jareth Glanda to graduation.

Recruiting

Position key

Recruits
Michigan's recruiting class consisted of 16 recruits. Jabrill Peppers was the considered highlight of the class; he was ranked as the third overall recruit in the country by 247's composite rankings, which averages the rankings of Rivals, Scout, ESPN, and 247.

Schedule

Radio
Radio coverage for all games was broadcast statewide on The Michigan Wolverines Football Network and on Sirius XM Satellite Radio. The radio announcers were Jim Brandstatter with play-by-play, Dan Dierdorf with color commentary, and Doug Karsch with sideline reports. Frank Beckmann retired after the 2013 season after 32 years as Michigan's play-by-play announcer.

Game summaries

vs. Appalachian State

Sources:

    
    
    
    
    
    
    
    
    

To open the season, Michigan faced the Appalachian State Mountaineers. During the previous meeting, Appalachian State became the first football championship subdivision (FCS) team to defeat a top 25 football bowl subdivision (FBS) team, defeating Michigan 34–32 in a massive upset. Prior to the game, Michigan announced that Devin Funchess would wear the #1 jersey, making him the first player to wear the #1 jersey since Braylon Edwards in 2004.

Michigan dominated the game, winning 52–14. Michigan opened the scoring in the first quarter with an eight-yard touchdown pass from Devin Gardner to Funchess, and expanded its lead late in the first quarter with a 34-yard touchdown pass from Gardner to Funchess. In the second quarter, Gardner threw his third touchdown pass of the game to Funchess giving Michigan a 21–0 lead. Michigan then scored 14 points in 38 seconds via a 12-yard touchdown run from De'Veon Smith and a 32-yard blocked punt return for a touchdown by Ben Gedeon giving Michigan a 35–0 lead at halftime. Michigan extended its lead in the third quarter via a one-yard touchdown run from Derrick Green before Appalachian State responded with an eight-yard touchdown pass from Kameron Bryant to Simms McElfresh. Michigan responded with a 13-yard touchdown run from Smith, making the score 49–7 at the end of the third quarter. In the fourth quarter, Appalachian State reduced Michigan's lead to 35 points via one-yard touchdown run from Marcus Cox, but Michigan ended the scoring via an 18-yard field goal from Matt Wile.

Michigan's captains for the game were Brennen Beyer, Frank Clark, Gardner, Desmond Morgan, and Jake Ryan. Freshman Mason Cole became the first true freshman in Michigan football history to start the season opener on the offensive line. Michigan scored 35 or more points in a half for the first time since the 2013 season opener against Central Michigan and scored more than 50 points in a game for the second consecutive season opener. Gardner completed 13 of 14 pass attempts for 173 yards and three touchdowns, with all three of those touchdowns being thrown to Funchess. Funchess's seven receptions matched a career-high, and his three touchdown receptions set a new career high. Derrick Green and De'Veon Smith each rushed for more than 100 yards—Green had 15 carries for 170 yards and a touchdown, while Smith had eight carries for 115 yards and two touchdowns—with both setting career highs for rushing yardage. This was the first game since 2007 that two Michigan running backs each had over 100 rushing yards, when Brandon Minor and Carlos Brown each rushed for over 100 yards against Minnesota. Ben Gedeon recorded his first career touchdown when returning a blocked punt in the second quarter. It was Michigan's first blocked punt return for a touchdown since the season opener against Central Michigan in 2013. Morgan and James Ross III led Michigan's defense with six tackles each, while Dymonte Thomas, Joe Bolden, and Ondre Pipkins each recorded a career-high five tackles.

at Notre Dame

Sources:

    
    
    
    

Following its game against Appalachian State, Michigan visited the Notre Dame Fighting Irish. This was the final game in the rivalry before it went on a hiatus. Michigan won the previous meeting 41–30.

Notre Dame shut out Michigan for the first time in series history, winning 31–0. Notre Dame opened the scoring in the first quarter via a one-yard touchdown run from Cam McDaniel, and then added to its lead in the second quarter with a one-yard touchdown pass from Everett Golson to Amir Carlisle. Shortly before halftime, Notre Dame made it 21–0 with a 24-yard touchdown pass from Golson to Will Fuller. In the third quarter, Notre Dame added to its lead with a 12-yard touchdown pass from Golson to Fuller, and then ended the scoring in the fourth quarter with a 43-yard field goal from Kyle Brindza.

This was the first time Michigan had been shut out since 1984 when it lost to Iowa 26–0, and it snapped an NCAA record of most consecutive games in which Michigan had scored a point at 365 games. Devin Funchess caught a career-high nine passes in the game, while Jake Ryan tied a career-high with eleven tackles. Jake Butt returned from his ACL injury to play for the first time this season. The captains for the game were Blake Countess, Will Hagerup, Joe Kerridge, and Raymon Taylor. Michigan's record against Notre Dame dropped to 24–17–1 with the loss.

vs. Miami (OH)

Sources:

    
    
    
    
    
    
    

Following the game against Notre Dame, Michigan hosted the Miami (OH) Redhawks. This was the first meeting between the two teams since 2008, which Michigan won 16–6.

Michigan won the game 34–10. Michigan opened the scoring in the first quarter with a 29-yard field goal from Matt Wile and added to its lead with a 17-yard touchdown pass from Gardner to Amara Darboh. Miami responded with ten points of its own in the second quarter to tie the game at ten with those points coming via a 26-yard field goal from Kaleb Patterson and a three-yard touchdown pass from Andrew Hendrix to Dawan Scott. Michigan regained the lead before halftime via a Derrick Green one-yard touchdown run, which made the score 17–10 in favor of Michigan at half-time. Michigan added to its lead in the third quarter via a 29-yard touchdown pass from Gardner to Jake Butt, and then increased its lead in the fourth quarter to 21 points via a 12-yard touchdown run from Green. Michigan ended the scoring in the fourth quarter with a 40-yard field goal from Wile.

Michigan's defense held Miami to 33 rushing yards, the lowest amount since Michigan allowed 32 rushing yards to Bowling Green in 2010. Derrick Green ran for 137 yards and two touchdowns, the first multi-touchdown performance of his career. Darboh had eight receptions for 88 yards, both career highs, and a touchdown. Jourdan Lewis intercepted a pass in the first quarter; this was Michigan's first forced turnover of the season. Jabrill Peppers recorded a career-high three tackles. The announced attendance of 102,824 pushed Michigan's streak of consecutive games with more than 100,000 fans in attendance to 253, but was Michigan's lowest attendance since a matchup against Memphis in 1995 that drew a crowd of 100,862.

vs. Utah

Sources:

    
    
    
    
    
    
    

Following its game against Miami, Michigan faced the Utah Utes. This was the first meeting since 2008, which Utah won 25–23.

Utah defeated Michigan 26–10 in a game that featured an almost two-and-a-half hour weather delay. Michigan opened the scoring in the first quarter via a Matt Wile 42-yard field goal, but Utah responded with a 35-yard field goal from Andy Phillips. Utah then took the lead in the second quarter via a Kaelin Clay 66-yard punt return for a touchdown, but Michigan tied the game via a Willie Henry seven-yard interception return for a touchdown. Utah then took the lead for good right before halftime via a 38-yard field goal from Phillips. In the third quarter, Utah extended its lead via a 28-yard pass from Travis Wilson to Dres Anderson. Utah ended the scoring in the fourth quarter with two Phillips field goals from 48 and 50 yards.

The weather delay was Michigan Stadium's first since 2011 against Western Michigan. The loss ended Michigan's 17-game winning streak against non-conference opponents at home, which dated back to 2008, and was Michigan's first loss at home in the month of September since 2007. Michigan's defense held Utah to three rushing yards in the first half. Jake Ryan led Michigan's defense with three tackles. Michigan's captains for the game were Anthony Capatina, Sione Houma, Jack Miller, and Mario Ojemudia.

vs. Minnesota

Sources:

    
    
    
    
    
    
    

After its game against Utah, Michigan faced the Minnesota Golden Gophers in its conference opener. In the previous meeting, Michigan dominated Minnesota and won by a score of 42–13.

Minnesota dominated Michigan, winning 30–14. After  a scoreless first quarter, Michigan opened the scoring early in the second quarter via a 10-yard touchdown run from De'Veon Smith. Minnesota responded with a 10-yard touchdown run from Mitch Leidner and then took a 10–7 lead into halftime via a Ryan Santoso 24-yard field goal as time expired. In the third quarter, Minnesota extended its lead via a 48-yard field goal from Santoso, a 30-yard interception return for a touchdown from De'Vondre Campbell, and a one-yard touchdown pass from Leidner to Maxx Williams, which made the score 27–7 in favor of Minnesota after three quarters. Minnesota further extended its lead in the fourth quarter via a 25-yard field goal form Santoso before Michigan ended the scoring with a three-yard touchdown run from Devin Gardner.

The loss was Michigan's first to Minnesota since the 2005 season. Michigan also saw a streak of eight consecutive wins in Big Ten openers end. Minnesota outgained Michigan 373–171 in total yardage. Devin Funchess extended his streak of consecutive games with a reception to 18 games. Will Hagerup punted eight times for a total of 400 yards. The loss meant that for the first time in the 135-year history of Michigan football, a Michigan team had lost three games before the month of October.

During the game, Michigan quarterback Shane Morris suffered a concussion but stayed in for another play. After having been removed for one play, he was re-inserted for one play after Gardner lost his helmet and was forced to sit out a play. The Michigan coaching staff and training staff came under fire for not removing Morris immediately after he suffered the concussion. Michigan originally stated that Morris only had a high ankle sprain, but reversed course in a statement from athletic director Dave Brandon and admitted that Morris had indeed suffered a concussion. Following the release of the statement, students held a protest on campus calling for either the resignation or firing of Brandon for his role in both this situation and for other past actions.

at Rutgers

Sources:

    
    
    
    
    
    
    
    

After facing Minnesota, Michigan traveled to New Jersey to face Rutgers, one of the newest members of the Big Ten Conference. This was the first meeting between the schools.

Rutgers defeated Michigan by a score of 26–24. Michigan opened the scoring in the first quarter with a 39-yard field goal from Matt Wile, but Rutgers responded with two Kyle Federico field goals (from 35 and 45 yards) to take a 6–3 lead. Michigan regained the lead in the second quarter via a Devin Gardner four-yard touchdown run, but Rutgers responded with an 80-yard touchdown pass from Gary Nova to Andrew Turzilli. The resulting extra point was blocked, giving Rutgers a 12–10 lead. Michigan regained the lead via a one-yard touchdown run from De'Veon Smith, but Rutgers responded shortly before halftime with a seven-yard touchdown pass from Nova to John Tsimis, which made the score 19–17 in favor of Rutgers at halftime. After a scoreless third quarter, Rutgers increased its lead to nine points via a 14-yard touchdown pass from Nova to Turzilli. Michigan responded with a 19-yard touchdown run from Devin Gardner but could not overcome the resulting two-point deficit.

Michigan fell to 0–2 in conference play for the first time since 1967. Rutgers became the only team in the Big Ten Conference to which Michigan has a losing record. Taco Charlton made the first start of his career. Devin Funchess has now recorded a reception in 19 consecutive games, while Jehu Chesson has caught a pass in eight consecutive games. Michigan's captains for the game were Devin Gardner, Jack Miller, Matt Wile, and Jarrod Wilson

vs. Penn State

Sources:

    
    
    
    
    
    
    

Following its game against Rutgers, Michigan returned to Ann Arbor to face the Penn State Nittany Lions. In the previous meeting, Penn State won by a score of 43–40 in quadruple overtime. The game was the first in-conference night game in Michigan Stadium's history.

Michigan defeated Penn State by a score of 18–13. Penn State opened the scoring in the first quarter with a 35-yard field goal from Sam Ficken, but Michigan responded with a 43-yard touchdown pass from Devin Gardner to Devin Funchess. Penn State cut Michigan's lead to one point late in the first quarter with a 32-yard field goal from Ficken. Penn State took the lead in the second quarter via a ten-yard touchdown pass from Christian Hackenberg to DaeSean Hamilton, but Michigan responded with a 45-yard field goal from Matt Wile, making the score 13–10 in favor of Penn State at halftime. Michigan scored all of the points in the second half. Michigan tied the game in the third quarter via a 42-yard field goal from Wile and then took the lead in the fourth quarter via a 37-yard field goal from Wile, which gave Michigan a 16–13 lead. Michigan scored the final points of the game on a safety when Penn State deliberately committed a safety in order to attempt to regain better field position for a potential game-winning drive. Penn State appeared to recover the ensuing onside kick but a controversial offside penalty forced Penn State to re-kick and Michigan recovered the kickoff, which ended the game.

Michigan improved its record to 3–0 when playing night games at Michigan Stadium. Michigan improved to 16–16 in the red zone. For the fifth time this season, Michigan's defense held an opponent to under 100 yards rushing. Gardner passed both Tom Brady and Jim Harbaugh and moved into sixth place on Michigan's all-time passing yardage list with 5,543 yards. Matt Wile's three field goals marked a new career high for him in field goals made in one game. Dennis Norfleet set a Michigan record for overall kick return yardage, as he increased his total to 2,029 yards from kick returns. Michigan's six sacks were the most Michigan has recorded in a game since Michigan played Utah in 2008. The safety in the fourth quarter was Michigan's first since 2011 against Ohio State. Michigan's captains for the game were Justice Hayes, Joe Kerridge, Jake Ryan, and Jarrod Wilson.

at Michigan State

Sources:

    
    
    
    
    
    

Following its clash with Penn State and a bye week, Michigan traveled to East Lansing to face its in-state rival, the Michigan State Spartans. This was the second straight year Michigan faces Michigan State at Michigan State. Michigan was dominated in the previous meeting, losing 29–6.

Michigan State dominated Michigan, winning 35–11. Michigan State opened the scoring in the first quarter with a two-yard touchdown run from Jeremy Langford. Michigan responded in the second quarter with a 48-yard field goal from Matt Wile, but Michigan State expanded its lead shortly before halftime with a one-yard touchdown run from Langford. In the third quarter, Michigan State expanded its lead via a 29-yard interception return for a touchdown from RJ Williamson and a 70-yard touchdown pass from Connor Cook to Tony Lippett. Michigan reduced Michigan State's lead to 11 points in the fourth quarter with a one-yard touchdown run from De'Veon Smith and a successful two-point conversion via a pass from Devin Gardner to Jake Butt, but Michigan State scored the final points of the game near the end of the fourth quarter via a five-yard touchdown run from Langford, his third of the game.

Michigan's captains for the game were Brennen Beyer, Gardner, Delote Hollowell, and Raymon Taylor. Wile's 48-yard field goal was a season long for him. Michigan's defense recovered two fumbles.

vs. Indiana

Sources:

    
    
    
    
    
    
    

After its trip to East Lansing, Michigan hosted the Indiana Hoosiers. This was the second meeting in a row played at Michigan Stadium between the two teams. Michigan won the previous meeting 63–47. Michigan announced prior to the game that tight end Jake Butt would be suspended for the game because of a violation of team rules.

Michigan dominated Indiana, winning 34–10. Michigan opened the scoring in the first quarter with a 35-yard field goal from Matt Wile and expanded its lead to ten points later in the first quarter via a six-yard touchdown pass from Devin Gardner to Keith Heitzman. Michigan added another touchdown in the second quarter via a 12-yard pass from Gardner to Amara Darboh, which made the score 17–0 in favor of Michigan at halftime. Indiana scored the first points of the third quarter via a 38-yard field goal from Griffin Oaks, but Michigan responded with a ten-yard touchdown run from Drake Johnson. Michigan expanded its lead to 20 via a 23-yard field goal from Matt Wile in the fourth quarter, Indiana cut Michigan's lead back to 17 points via a three-yard touchdown run from D'Angelo Roberts. Michigan scored the final points of the game via a 16-yard touchdown run from Johnson.

Michigan's captains for the game were Joe Bolden, Joe Kerridge, and Jarrod Wilson. Michigan has now won 19 consecutive games against Indiana, which dates back to 1988, and is also 12–1 against Indiana when facing Indiana as a homecoming opponent. Michigan improved its homecoming record to 87–27. Michigan's run defense held Indiana to 167 yards rushing; Indiana was averaging 289.9 yards per game on the ground prior to the game. Michigan's defense also only allowed 24 yards passing, which was the fewest allowed since Michigan allowed 15 passing yards against Rice in 1999. Heitzman's touchdown reception in the first quarter was his first career touchdown. Darboh set career highs for receptions (9) and yards (107), while Johnson set career highs in rushing attempts (16), yards (122), and touchdowns (2).

at Northwestern

Sources:

    
    
    

Following its game against Indiana, Michigan traveled to Evanston for the second consecutive year to face the Northwestern Wildcats. Michigan won the previous meeting 27–19 in triple overtime.

Michigan won a turnover filled game 10–9, stopping Northwestern's attempted go-ahead two-point conversion with three seconds remaining in the game. After a turnover filled first half during which Michigan had a field goal attempt blocked, Michigan opened the scoring in the third quarter with a three-yard touchdown run from De'Veon Smith. Northwestern reduced Michigan's lead to four points in the fourth quarter with a 21-yard field goal from Jack Mitchell, but Michigan regained its seven-point lead with a 37-yard field goal from Matt Wile. Northwestern responded with a three-yard touchdown pass from Trevor Siemian to Toby Jones with three seconds remaining in the game, but the ensuing two-point conversion in an attempt to win the game in regulation was unsuccessful when Frank Clark's pressure caused Trevor Siemian to slip on the wet grass. Michigan recovered the ensuing onside kick and won the game.

Michigan's captains for the game were Brennen Beyer, Blake Countess, Amara Darboh, and Jack Miller. Michigan held Northwestern to a total of 12 rushing yards. Jake Ryan recorded his first career interception during the game. Michigan won its fourth game in a row against Northwestern.

The game is often remembered in infamy as the "M00N game," referencing the display on the scoreboard at halftime.

vs. Maryland

Sources:

    
    
    
    
    
    
    
    

After its game against Northwestern and another bye week, Michigan played its final home game of the season against Maryland, one of the newest members of the Big Ten Conference. This was the first meeting between the schools since 1990, which Michigan won 45–17.

Maryland defeated Michigan, winning 23–16. The teams traded field goals throughout the first half. Michigan opened the scoring in the first quarter with a 22-yard field goal from Matt Wile. Maryland responded in the second quarter with a 38-yard field goal from Brad Craddock. Michigan regained the lead with a 33-yard field goal from Wile, but Maryland tied the game with a 41-yard field goal from Craddock and gained the lead with a 21-yard field goal from Craddock. Michigan tied the game as time expired in the first half with a 26-yard field goal from Wile, which made the score 9–9 at halftime. Michigan regained the lead in the third quarter via a 15-yard touchdown run from Devin Gardner, but Maryland tied the game in the fourth quarter via an eight-yard touchdown run from C.J. Brown and then took the lead for good with a one-yard touchdown run from Wes Brown.

Michigan's streak of consecutive games with over 100,000 was extended to 258, but it was Michigan's lowest attended game since the game against Memphis in 1995. Michigan's captains were Brennen Beyer, Gardner, Jake Ryan, and Raymon Taylor. Michigan held its opponent without a score in the first quarter for the third consecutive game. Joe Bolden and Ryan both set career highs with 14 tackles each. Joe Kerridge set a career long rush of 52 yards during a successful fake punt attempt in the first quarter.

at Ohio State

Sources:

    
    
    
    
    
    
    
    
    

To end the regular season, Michigan faced its arch-rival Ohio State in the 111th meeting of "The Game". Ohio State won the previous edition 42–41, with Michigan missing a two-point conversion attempt that would have made the score 43–42 in favor of Michigan with 32 seconds remaining in the game.

Ohio State defeated Michigan to record its third consecutive victory over the Wolverines, winning 42–28. Ohio State opened the scoring in the first quarter with a six-yard touchdown pass from J. T. Barrett to Nick Vannett. Michigan responded with a 12-yard touchdown pass from Devin Gardner to Jake Butt and then took the lead in the second quarter via a two-yard touchdown run from Drake Johnson. Ohio State tied the game seven seconds before halftime via a 25-yard touchdown run from Barrett, which made the score 14–14 at halftime. Ohio State regained the lead in the third quarter via a two-yard touchdown run from Barrett, but Michigan responded with a four-yard touchdown run from Drake Johnson. Ohio State took the lead for good via a two-yard touchdown run from Ezekiel Elliott shortly before the end of the third quarter. In the fourth quarter, Ohio State added to its lead via a 44-yard touchdown run from Elliott and a 33-yard fumble return for a touchdown from Darron Lee. Michigan reduced Ohio State's margin of victory to 14 points via a three-yard touchdown pass from Gardner to Freddy Canteen.

Devin Funchess recorded a reception for the 25th straight game. Mason Cole became the first true freshman since 2009 to start all twelve games for Michigan and became the most started true freshman offensive lineman in program history. The captains for the game were Joe Bolden, Jack Miller, Jake Ryan, and Jarrod Wilson.

Depth chart
Starters and backups against Appalachian State.

2015 NFL Draft

Three Wolverines were drafted in the 2015 NFL Draft. Devin Gardner signed as an undrafted free agent with the New England Patriots.

Roster

References

External links

Michigan
Michigan Wolverines football seasons
Michigan Wolverines football